This is an inclusive list of science fiction television programs whose names begin with the numbers 0 through 9.

0-9

References

Science fiction lists